Liefde waakt  is a 1914 Dutch silent Western film directed by Louis H. Chrispijn.

Cast
 Annie Bos as Jennie
 Willem van der Veer
 Christine van Meeteren
 Jan van Dommelen as Painter
 Jan Holtrop as Gang leader, Jennie's father
 Mientje Kling as Extra
 Alex Benno as Policeman
 Emile Timrott
 Marius Spree

External links 
 

1914 films
1914 Western (genre) films
Dutch Western (genre) films
Dutch black-and-white films
Dutch silent short films
Films directed by Louis H. Chrispijn
Silent Western (genre) films